Hibbing City Hall is the seat of local government for Hibbing, Minnesota, United States.  It was built in Colonial Revival style in 1922.  Hibbing City Hall was listed on the National Register of Historic Places in 1981 for its state-level significance in the themes of architecture and politics/government.  It was nominated for being one of northern Minnesota's most architecturally distinctive public buildings and the longstanding seat of government for one of the largest communities of the Iron Range.

See also
 List of city and town halls in the United States
 National Register of Historic Places listings in St. Louis County, Minnesota

References

1922 establishments in Minnesota
Buildings and structures in Hibbing, Minnesota
City and town halls in Minnesota
City and town halls on the National Register of Historic Places in Minnesota
Colonial Revival architecture in Minnesota
Government buildings completed in 1922
National Register of Historic Places in St. Louis County, Minnesota